The usage share of BitTorrent clients is the percentage of users that use a particular BitTorrent client, regardless of version.

2020

2015
Lifehacker, a software weblog, took a survey of 13,823 readers' preferred BitTorrent clients in May 2015. It showed that μTorrent still maintains a sizable lead over competitors, despite concerns over adware and bloatware. Runner-up Transmission was praised for being lightweight, while qBittorrent was praised for being cross-platform and open-source, Deluge for its plugin library, and Tixati for its simplicity. Vuze, another notable client, failed to make an appearance in the top five for the first time.

2009

Delft University of Technology
A study by the Tribler P2P research team at the Delft University of Technology. To generate this data, samples were taken from a number of swarms of users which were then used to identify which BitTorrent client each user was using, this data was used by TorrentFreak in the table below:

2007

Digital Music News
Digital Music News collected the data from PC Pitstop, a company that gathers data from computers using their free online virus and malware scanners. The program scans Windows Registry to find which clients have been installed, more than a million Microsoft Windows computers were surveyed.

References

BitTorrent clients
BitTorrent clients